Floyd Otter is a giant sequoia located in Garfield Grove, which is itself located near the town of Three Rivers, California.  The tree was named after former Mountain Home Demonstration State Forest manager Floyd L. Otter. The tree is the twelfth largest giant sequoia in the world. It was severely burned in the Castle Fire in 2020 and may be moribund.

History
In fall 1978, Naturalists Gus Boik, Wendell D. Flint, and Robert Walker discovered the two large giant sequoia trees (Eric De Groot and Floyd Otter) just upslope from King Arthur. However, the group did not have time to name or measure the two trees after measuring King Arthur. In 1993, Flint again mentioned the existence of an unnamed, roughly 25-foot (7.62 meter) diameter giant sequoia just upslope from King Arthur that he wasn't able to formally measure or name.

In 2001, naturalists James Chelebda, Arthur P. Cowley, Lawrence L. Otter (son of Floyd L. Otter), and Michael Reed were able to locate, measure, and name Floyd Otter while surveying Garfield Grove for the National Park Service.  Their measurements were later published in December 2012, along with a definitive list of the 30 largest known giant sequoias and their respective measurements.

Dimensions

See also
List of largest giant sequoias
List of individual trees

References

Individual giant sequoia trees
Sequoia National Park